Combretum rotundifolium, the monkey brush or monkey brush vine, is a plant species in the genus Combretum found in South America.

Combretum rotundifolium contains acidic dammarane arabinofuranosides.

The bright yellow/red flowers are the decoration of the interior where the color green is in abu. When in blossom the flower buds will slowly burst open giving this exotic vine its 'monkey brush' appearance.

References 

 Cambess. Fl. Bras. Merid. (quarto ed.) 2(17): 247, pl. 129 1829 [1830]

External links 

rotundifolium
Plants described in 1792

it is also a natural food source for animals, for instance a hummingbird. but, also it is a resting place for other animals too.